In signal processing, overlap–save is the traditional name for an efficient way to evaluate the discrete convolution between a very long signal  and a finite impulse response (FIR) filter :

where  for m outside the region .

The concept is to compute short segments of y[n] of an arbitrary length L, and concatenate the segments together.  Consider a segment that begins at n = kL + M, for any integer k, and define:

These steps are illustrated in the first 3 traces of Figure 1, except that the desired portion of the output (third trace) corresponds to 1  ≤     ≤  L.

If we periodically extend xk[n] with period N  ≥  L + M − 1, according to:the convolutions    and    are equivalent in the region .
 is customarily chosen such that  is an integer power-of-2, and the transforms are implemented with the FFT algorithm, for efficiency.
The leading and trailing edge-effects of circular convolution are overlapped and added, and subsequently discarded.

Pseudocode
 (Overlap-save algorithm for linear convolution)
 h = FIR_impulse_response
 M = length(h)
 overlap = M − 1
 N = 8 × overlap    (see next section for a better choice)
 step_size = N − overlap
 H = DFT(h, N)
 position = 0
 
 while position + N ≤ length(x)
     yt = IDFT(DFT(x(position+(1:N))) × H)
     y(position+(1:step_size)) = yt(M : N)    (discard M−1 y-values)
     position = position + step_size
 endEfficiency considerations

When the DFT and IDFT are implemented by the FFT algorithm, the pseudocode above requires about  complex multiplications for the FFT, product of arrays, and IFFT.  Each iteration produces  output samples, so the number of complex multiplications per output sample is about:For example, when M=201 and N=1024,  equals 13.67, whereas direct evaluation of  would require up to 201 complex multiplications per output sample, the worst case being when both x and h are complex-valued.  Also note that for any given M,  has a minimum with respect to N'.  Figure 2 is a graph of the values of N that minimize  for a range of filter lengths (M).

The total number of complex multiplications would be:

Comparatively, the number of complex multiplications required by the pseudocode algorithm is:

Hence the cost of the overlap–save method scales almost as  while the cost of a single, large circular convolution is almost . 

Overlap–discardOverlap–discard and Overlap–scrap are less commonly used labels for the same method described here.  However, these labels are actually better (than overlap–save) to distinguish from overlap–add, because both methods "save", but only one discards.  "Save" merely refers to the fact that M − 1 input (or output) samples from segment k are needed to process segment k'' + 1.

Extending overlap–save
The overlap–save algorithm can be extended to include other common operations of a system:

 additional IFFT channels can be processed more cheaply than the first by reusing the forward FFT
 sampling rates can be changed by using different sized forward and inverse FFTs
 frequency translation (mixing) can be accomplished by rearranging frequency bins

See also 
Overlap–add method

Notes

References

, also available at https://patentimages.storage.googleapis.com/4d/39/2a/cec2ae6f33c1e7/US6898235.pdf

External links 

 Dr. Deepa Kundur, Overlap Add and Overlap Save, University of Toronto

Signal processing
Transforms
Fourier analysis
Numerical analysis